Olympique de Nouméa is a New Caledonian football team playing at the second level New Caledonia Second Level. It is based in Nouméa. Their home stadium is Stade Numa-Daly.

Achievements
New Caledonia Cup: 2
 1962, 1963

Football clubs in New Caledonia